Heim Glacier, is a glacier in eastern Greenland. It is named after Swiss geologist and glacial phenomena expert Albert Heim (1849–1937).

Geography 
The Heim Glacier originates in the Eastern side of the Greenland Ice Sheet. It has its terminus in the eastern side of the head of Johan Petersen Fjord separated by nunataks from the terminus of the Bruckner Glacier to the east. 

Together the Heim and Bruckner glaciers discharge icebergs into the inner part of the fjord.

Bibliography
Climate-related glacier fluctuations in southeast Greenland

See also
List of glaciers in Greenland

References

External links
Southeast Greenland glaciers to warm Atlantic Water from Operation IceBridge and Ocean Melting Greenland data - ResearchGate 

Glaciers of Greenland